The following highways are numbered 916:

Canada
Saskatchewan Highway 916

United States